Afghan Americans ( Amrikāyi-hāye Afghān tabar,  Da Amrīka Afghanan) are Americans of Afghan descent or Americans who originated from Afghanistan. They form the largest Afghan community in North America with the second being Afghan Canadians. The Afghan Americans may originate from any of the ethnic groups of Afghanistan. They have long been considered by the Board of Immigration Appeals and the United States Census Bureau as White Americans, but a significant number of individuals may also identify themselves as Middle Eastern or as Asian Americans, or even as "Central Asian" or "South Asian".

The Afghan community in the United States was minimal until large numbers were admitted as refugees following the December 1979 Soviet invasion of Afghanistan. Others have arrived similarly during and after the latest war in Afghanistan. Afghan Americans reside and work all across the United States. The states of California, Virginia and New York historically had the largest number of Afghan Americans. Thousands may also be found in the states of Arizona, Texas, Georgia, Washington, Oklahoma, Idaho, Missouri, North Carolina, and Illinois. As of 2022, their total number is approximately 155,000.

History and population
Afghan Americans have a long history of immigrating to the United States, as they have arrived as early as the 1860s. This was around the time when Afghanistan–United States relations were being established. Wallace Fard Muhammad claimed to have been from Afghanistan. A World War I draft registration card for Wallie Dodd Fard from 1917 indicated he was living in Los Angeles, California, as an unmarried restaurant owner, and reported that he was born in Shinka, Afghanistan in 1893. Between the 1920s and 1940s, hundreds of Afghans immigrated to the United States. Between 1953 and early 1970, at least 230 lawfully entered the United States. Some of them were students who had been granted scholarships to study in American universities.

Afghan refugees and the Refugee Act of 1980

After the 1979 Soviet invasion of Afghanistan, around five million Afghan citizens were displaced. They were compelled to secretly migrate to (or seek refuge in) other countries. These Afghan refugees or asylum seekers found temporary shelter in neighboring Pakistan and Iran, and from there thousands made it to Europe, North America, Oceania, and elsewhere in the world. Under the law, the ones born in Pakistan, Iran or India are not in any way Pakistanis, Iranians or Indians. Their birth certificates and other legal documents confirm that they are citizens of Afghanistan.

Beginning in 1980, Afghan Americans arrived into the United States as families. They were admitted as refugees or asylum seekers. In some cases a family was represented by only one parent due to the death of the other parent. They began settling in the New York metropolitan area, California (mainly in the San Francisco Bay Area and the Los Angeles-Orange County area) and in other parts of the United States, where large Muslim community centers keep them bonded. Fremont, California, is home to the largest population of Afghan Americans followed by Northern Virginia and then Queens in New York City. Smaller Afghan American communities also exist in the states of Texas, Arizona, Oklahoma, Washington, Georgia, Michigan, Idaho, Missouri, Illinois, Pennsylvania, Florida, North Carolina, Massachusetts, Maryland, Connecticut, Colorado, Ohio, Utah, New Mexico, Oregon, Tennessee and so on. In the city of Chicago, the 2000 census counted 556 Afghan Americans, approximately half of them within the city.

The first arrivals of Afghan families in the early 1980s were mainly the wealthy and from the urban and educated elite. They had rightfully applied for refugee status while temporarily residing in Pakistan and India, and a large number had similarly resided in Germany before their firm resettlement in the United States. The family reunification program brought in less affluent communities from rural Afghanistan, many of which were illiterate and maintained a more traditional village lifestyle.

Child Citizenship Act of 2000

Those admitted under  and becoming green card recipients under  are statutorily protected against inadmissibility, even if they are not in possession of their green cards, Afghan passports, Afghan identity cards, or any other legal document. In addition to that privilege or benefit, whenever one parent becomes naturalized all of his or her children statutorily become entitled to naturalization through such American parent. This conferral of American nationality statutorily extends to all of his or her children that are born outside of the United States. All such nationality claims are statutorily reviewable under the federal judiciary of the United States.

Post September 11, 2001, the Afghan American community faced discriminations. Bush's plan to legalize works to help the economy came to a halt after the terror attack in 2001. It interrupted talk of legalizing immigrants thus leading to few admitted immigrants from 2001 to 2005. 406,080 immigrant visas were issued in 2001. 395,005 were issued in 2005 according to the Department of Homeland Security.

Afghan Allies Protection Act of 2009

A news reporter in 2001 randomly stated, without providing any references or sources, that there were 200,000 Afghan Americans. This wild assumption probably included Afghan Canadians. According to the U.S. Census Bureau, there were approximately 65,972 Afghan-Americans in 2006. The American Community Survey (ACS) estimated a total of 94,726 Afghan foreign-born immigrants were residing and working in the United States in 2016, which shows a 30% increase in the last ten years. Since 2005, thousands of Afghans have been admitted to the United States under the Special Immigrant Visa (SIV) program. Congress passed the Afghan Allies Protection Act of 2009, which was extended in 2014. Afghans who had put their lives at risk during the US-led war in Afghanistan became eligible for SIVs. This program for Afghans created a legal pathway towards U.S. citizenship for the recipients and their immediate family members.

Evacuations of 2021

Large numbers of Afghans, including those that worked with the United States, moved to the country following the Taliban take over of Kabul in August 2021.

Discrimination of Refugees 
Afghans who went through resettlement difficulties may experience discrimination, worsening the trauma.

Culture

As other immigrants in the United States, Afghan Americans have gradually adopted the American way of life. But many of those who were born in Afghanistan still highly value Afghan culture. For example, they often wear at home Afghan clothes, watch Afghan shows, listen to Afghan music, eat mostly Afghan food, and enthusiastically keep up with Afghan politics. They also value their oral tradition of story telling. The stories they sometimes tell are about Mullah Nasreddin, Afghan history, myths and religions.

Afghan Americans celebrate August 19 as Afghan Independence Day, which relates to August 1919, the date when Afghanistan became fully independent after the signing of the Anglo-Afghan Treaty. Small festivals are held in cities that have Afghan communities, usually at the parks where black, red and green colored Afghan flags are spotted around cars. Eid and Nowruz remain popular festivals for Afghans. The 2021 American sitcom United States of Al featured American and Afghan culture.

A The Washington Post article from October 2001 claims that the Afghan-American community, "concentrated in the towns of Fremont and Hayward, is in many ways a microcosm of the country that's nearly a dozen time zones away." Various members of the community commented that the Afghan community, following conflicts and divisions at home, are still divided in the United States, but that they all share love for their home country.

Ethnicity and race

Afghan Americans are composed of the various ethnic groups that exist in Afghanistan, which include Pashtun, Tajik, Hazara, Uzbek, Turkmen, Baloch, and a number of others. Since 1945, Afghan Americans have been officially classified as Caucasians. For U.S. Census purposes Afghans are racially categorized as White Americans. Some Afghan Americans, however, may self identify as being Middle Eastern Americans,Central Asian Americans or Asian Americans. In recent years the creation of a new census category called SWANA (which includes Afghan Americans) has been proposed in an effort for more accurate categorization.

Religion

The majority of Afghan-Americans are Muslims whom follow Sunni Islam, with a sizable community of Shia Muslims. Many Afghan Americans residing in Northern Virginia are members of the All Dulles Area Muslim Society, which has a number of local branches. After the September 11 attacks in 2001, a mosque run by Afghan-Americans in New York City donated blood, held a vigil for those who died inside the World Trade Center (WTC) and funded a memorial for the New York City fire fighters.

There is a community of Afghan Jews in New York City, numbering about 200 families in 2007. A group of Afghan Americans in the Los Angeles area follow Christianity. Hussain Andaryas is an Afghan Christian televangelist who belongs to the Hazara ethnic group. Outside of the Abrahamic faiths, there exists a community of Afghan Hindus and Afghan Sikhs. They are mainly found in the states of New York and Maryland.

Media
Afghan Americans have formed media outlets dedicated for its diaspora. Examples include television channels such as Ariana Afghanistan, Payam-e-Afghan, Tuti TV, and Pamir TV. In the 1990s, Afghanistan TV broadcast on KSCI Channel 18 in Los Angeles and as well as magazines like the Afghanistan Mirror. Many organizations have also been formed for Afghan youth, solidarity, women's rights and more. Recently a new radio station has also launched named Radio Afghan Los Angeles. In 2020, "Afghanistan by Afghans" a TV show and podcast was started by Misaq Kazimi, showcasing the voices of Afghan artists, thinkers and cultural keepers. The show is also showcased on Zarin TV.

Demographics

Economics

Many Afghan Americans own real estate in Afghanistan, which in some cases have been lawfully inherited from their earliest ancestors for generations upon generations. Afghan Americans who arrived before the 21st century are mostly found residing near other middle class Americans. Some may be found living in the upper middle class neighborhoods and earning high salaries.

Because the majority of Afghan Americans were originally admitted as refugees under , the government provided various forms of assistance (welfare) and selected their city of residence. Some decided to move to other cities that had larger Afghan communities but most remained in the cities where they first arrived. They gradually left the government assistance programs and eventually mortgaged homes. Their children were sent to colleges or universities. Those who could not achieve this decided to build or franchise small businesses. Others became real estate agents, bank employees, office workers, hotel workers, store clerks, salespersons, security guards, drivers, mechanics, waiters, etc.

Like many other immigrants in the United States, Afghan Americans often engage in the operation of small businesses. Many operate American and Afghan restaurants as well as Afghan markets, while some have been reported in the 1990s as vendors in Manhattan where they have replaced Greek Americans in the field.

The family incomes of Afghan Americans (specifically, those that were termed "refugees") was a median of $50,000 in 2015. This figure is higher than Mexican Americans, Cuban Americans and slightly higher than Hmong Americans, but lower than Vietnamese Americans.

Education
Afghan immigrants that were admitted to the United States before 1979 were well educated. In contrast, current immigrants have escaped from totalitarianism, genocide, torture, persecution, mistreatment, and military conflicts. This group has had some trouble coping with learning the English language. Those who have pursued their education in America during the middle of the 20th century and traveled back to Afghanistan faced trouble attaining employment when returning to the United States since their education, often in medicine and engineering, is frequently viewed as outdated. After the 1979 Soviet invasion, Afghanistan's education system worsened, causing many migrants in the late 20th century to place less emphasis on educational attainment.

Notable people

Politics, academia and literature
Zalmay Khalilzad – U.S. Ambassador to the United Nations from 2007 to 2009
Ashraf Ghani - 5th President of Afghanistan
Ali Jalali – Distinguished Professor at the National Defense University in Washington, D.C.; ex-Afghan diplomat
Mohammad Qayoumi – Former President of San Jose State University and California State University, East Bay
Safiya Wazir - Member of the New Hampshire House of Representatives
 Aisha Wahab - Member of the Hayward City Council
Ajmal Ahmady - Politician in Afghanistan
Said Tayeb Jawad – Ambassador of Afghanistan to the United States from 2003 to 2010
Nazif Shahrani – Professor of anthropology at Indiana University
Ishaq Shahryar – Afghan Ambassador to the United States from 2002 to 2003
Wali Karzai – Professor of Bio-Chemistry at Stony Brook University
M. Ishaq Nadiri – Professor of economics at NYU and signatory  at 2001 Afghanistan Bonn conference
Nake M. Kamrany – Professor of economics at University of Southern California
Haris Tarin – Director of Muslim Public Affairs Council ( MPAC)
Tamim Ansary – Author of West of Kabul, East of New York, a book published in 2001, shortly after the "9-11" attacks.
Khaled Hosseini – Best-selling author whose work includes The Kite Runner and A Thousand Splendid Suns
Fariba Nawa – Author of Opium Nation and journalist
Qais Akbar Omar – Author of A Fort of Nine Towers and co-author of Shakespeare in Kabul
Hamid Naweed - Author and art historian
Leila Christine Nadir - Writer and Artist
Ghulam Haider Hamidi - Former Mayor of Kandahar
Hafizullah Emadi (born Shibar), independent scholar and development consultant for Focus Humanitarian Assistance
Safi Rauf (born 1994) - 2021 Washingtonian of the Year, TED fellow, Tillman scholar, Georgetown graduate, Navy reservist, and the founder of Human First Coalition

Business and finance
Mahmoud Karzai – Brother of former Afghan President Hamid Karzai and owner of Afghan cuisine restaurant
Qayum Karzai – Brother of former Afghan President Hamid Karzai and owner of Afghan cuisine restaurants in the Southern California and Baltimore–Washington Metropolitan Area
Ehsan Bayat – Business entrepreneur who founded Afghan Wireless
 Masuda Sultan (born 1978), entrepreneur, international human rights advocate, and memoirist

Sports
Hailai Arghandiwal - Association football (soccer) player who plays for German club Duisburg and the Afghan national team.
Adam Najem – Association football player who plays as a midfielder for Canadian Premier League club FC Edmonton, and the Afghanistan national team.
David Najem – Association football player who plays as a defender for USL Championship club New Mexico United and the Afghanistan national team
Ahmad Hatifi – Association football player who is a midfielder and currently plays for CD Aguiluchos USA
Mohammad Mashriqi - Association football player
Alex Hinshaw – Former baseball pitcher
Jeff Bronkey – Former baseball player
Shamila Kohestani - Former soccer player and founder of the first women's national soccer team

Media and art
Azita Ghanizada – Actress and TV host, she appeared in a number of films and TV shows
Donnie Keshawarz - Canadian-American stage, film and television actor of Afghan descent
Sonia Nassery Cole – Actress and director
Anwar Hajher – Filmmaker and professor, 16 Days in Afghanistan
Youssof Kohzad – Artist, Poet, Painter and Actor
Zakia Kohzad – Former Afghan actress and news anchor
Nabil Miskinyar – Television anchor
Jawed Wassel – Writer/Director of first Afghan Oscar contender Feature Film called FireDancer.
Josh Gad – Actor appearing in Frozen and Jobs. Afghan-Jewish father.
Leena Alam – Actress from Kabuli Kid, Loori, Soil and Coral, and The Unknown
Fahim Fazli – Actor who appears in various films, such as Iron Man
Robert Joffrey – born Abdullah Jaffa Bey Khan is known for co-founder of the Joffrey Ballet
Aman Mojadidi – Artist whose art focuses on Afghan politics and cross-cultural identity
Noor Wodjouatt, founder of Zarin TV and performer at Kennedy Center

Musicians
Omar Akram – Pianist who won a Grammy award for best new age album 
Farhad Darya – Afghan musician
Jawad Ghaziyar – Afghan musician
Rahim Jahani – Afghan musician
Naim Popal – Afghan musician
Ahmad Wali – Afghan musician
Aziz Herawi - Afghan musician
Naghma - Afghan musician
Ehsan Aman - Afghan musician

Beauty pageant contestants
Zohra Daoud – Miss Afghanistan 1974
Vida Samadzai – Beauty for a Cause of Miss Earth 2003

Afghan royalty
Ahmad Shah Khan, Crown Prince of Afghanistan and  Khatul Begum, Princess of Afghanistan

Other
Hevad Khan – Professional Poker player
Zahira Zahir - Sister of Afghan singer Ahmad Zahir. Known for cutting the hair George W. Bush, among others.
Ahmad Khan Rahami – Perpetrator of the 2016 New York and New Jersey bombings
Omar Mateen – Perpetrator of the 2016 Orlando nightclub shooting
Razia Jan - head of non-profit education organization in Afghanistan
Shamim Jawad - Women's rights advocate and aid worker

See also

Afghan diaspora
Afghanistan–United States relations
Demographics of Afghanistan

References

Further reading
 Aslami, Wajma. "The Impact of 9/11 on Afghan-American Leaders." Journal of Applied Management and Entrepreneurship 15.1 (2010): 124+.
 Baden, John Kenneth. "Through Disconnection and Revival: Afghan American Relations with Afghanistan, 1890-2016." (PhD Diss. Case Western Reserve University, 2018).
 Cvetkovich, Ann. “Can the Diaspora Speak? Afghan Americans and the 9/11 Oral History Archive.” Radical History Review (2011), no. 111 (2011): 90-100.
 Eigo, Tim. "Afghan Americans." Gale Encyclopedia of Multicultural America, edited by Thomas Riggs, (3rd ed., vol. 1, Gale, 2014), pp. 17–30. online
 Lipson, Juliene G., and Patricia A. Omidian. “Afghans.” In Refugees in America in the 1990s: A Reference Handbook, edited by David W. Haines. (Greenwood Press, 1996).
 Thernstrom, Stephan, ed. Harvard Encyclopedia of American Ethnic Groups (1980) pp 3–5.

External links

Afghan American Demographics
Afghan-American Chamber of Commerce
In Va.'s Little Kabul, Joy (Washington Post, Nov. 14, 2001)

 
American people of Afghan descent
Afghan diaspora
Central Asian American